Princess Isabella may refer to:

 Princess Isabella of Armenia (c. 1278–c. 1321), daughter of Leo III
 Princess Isabella of Bavaria (1863–1924)
 Princess Amalie Isabella of Bavaria (1921–1985)
 Princess Isabel Alfonsa of Bourbon-Two Sicilies (1904–1985)
 Isabel, Princess Imperial of Brazil (1846–1921), daughter and heir of Pedro II, Emperor of Brazil
 Princess Isabella of Croÿ (1856–1931), wife of Archduke Friedrich, Duke of Teschen
 Princess Isabella of Denmark (born 2007), daughter of Crown Prince Frederik and Crown Princess Mary
 Isabel Moctezuma (1509–1550/1510 – 1550/1551), daughter of the Aztec ruler Moctezuma II
 Princess Isabelle of Orléans (1878–1961)
 Princess Isabella Maria of Parma (1741–1763), wife to Joseph II, Holy Roman Emperor
 Infanta Isabel Maria of Portugal (1801–1876)
 Isabel Luísa, Princess of Beira (1668–1690), Portugal
 Isabella, Princess of Asturias (1851–1931)
 Isabella of Armenia, Princess of Tyre (1275–1323)
 Princess Isabel, a character in Elena of Avalor

See also 
 Princess Isabelle (disambiguation)
 Queen Isabella (disambiguation)